Siriraj Piyamaharajkarun Hospital (SiPH) To be a medical center that provides medical services and counseling for specific diseases with international standards, JCI (Joint Commission International). Moreover, to be a model for government hospitals to operates with a special management system. In terms of having income to be able to support themselves sustainably, in order to give income back to the Faculty of Medicine Siriraj Hospital, Mahidol University.

History 
The Faculty of Medicine Siriraj Hospital, Mahidol University was transferred a piece of land adjacent to the Chao Phraya River from the State Railway of Thailand following the board resolutions since 2003 from the cabinet and State Railway of Thailand, and finally on 11 January 2010 with an area of 33 rai, 2 ngan, and 94 square wa (53,976 square meters). King Bhumibol Adulyadej graciously conferred Princess Sirindhorn to lay the foundation stone for the building part of the project 'Siriraj towards a top medical institute in Southeast Asia' around the old Bangkok Noi railway station and named the building 'Piyamaharajkarun Building'. On 6 July 2010, the Faculty of Medicine board renamed the building as 'Siriraj Piyamaharajkarun Hospital (SiPH)'. The hospital opened on 26 April 2012.

Facilities 
Siriraj Piyamaharajkarun operates the following special medical centers:

See also 
 Siriraj Hospital
 Health in Thailand
 Hospitals in Thailand
 List of hospitals in Thailand

References 

 Article incorporates material from the corresponding article in the Thai Wikipedia

External links 
 

Mahidol University
Hospitals in Bangkok
Bangkok Noi district